Gerbillurus is a genus of rodent in the family Muridae. It contains the following species:
 Hairy-footed gerbil (Gerbillurus paeba)
 Namib brush-tailed gerbil (Gerbillurus setzeri)
 Dune hairy-footed gerbil (Gerbillurus tytonis)
 Bushy-tailed hairy-footed gerbil (Gerbillurus vallinus)

References

 
Rodent genera
Taxonomy articles created by Polbot